"Friends Will Be Friends" is a song performed by Queen, written by Freddie Mercury and John Deacon, released on 9 June 1986 as a single for the album A Kind of Magic. It was the band's 30th single in the UK upon its release, reaching number 14 in the UK.

"Friends Will Be Friends" was performed live on The Magic Tour. It is remarkable in that it was the first and only song that was sung at the end of concerts between "We Will Rock You" and "We Are the Champions" since the News of the World Tour in 1977.

The song was included in various greatest hits compilations by Queen such as Greatest Hits II, Greatest Flix II and Greatest Video Hits II.

Musical arrangement
The song's key signature is G major, and makes heavy use of Brian May's melodic guitar playing style. The song was debuted on the second show of The Magic Tour (Leiden). Queen played the complete version of the song for the first two Leiden shows then the arrangement was shortened on 14 June (Paris). The shorter version is featured on the Live At Wembley release. On all live versions, the song was performed in F major, modulated down a tone.

Music video
The video was directed by DoRo and filmed at JDC Studios, Wembley in May 1986 and features the band performing the song in front of fan club members. During the show, Freddie Mercury "high fives" audience members, and at the end cuts the mic and sings along with them, letting them lead. Because of this, this performance was nicknamed "Queen's Greatest Show Never Performed".

Track listings 
7" Single

A Side. "Friends Will Be Friends" (Album Version) - 4:07

B Side. "Seven Seas Of Rhye" - 2:46

12" Single

A Side. "Friends Will Be Friends" (Extended Version) - 6:15

B1. "Friends Will Be Friends" (Album Version) - 4:07

B2. "Seven Seas Of Rhye" - 2:46

Personnel
Freddie Mercury - lead and backing vocals, piano, synthesizer
Brian May - lead guitar, backing vocals
Roger Taylor - drums, backing vocals
John Deacon - bass guitar, rhythm guitar

Charts

References

External links
Official music video on YouTube
 Lyrics at Queen official website

Queen (band) songs
1986 singles
Rock ballads
Songs written by Freddie Mercury
Songs written by John Deacon
Song recordings produced by Reinhold Mack
EMI Records singles
Capitol Records singles
Hollywood Records singles
Songs about friendship